Lands administrative divisions of Queensland refers to the divisions of Queensland used for the registration of land titles. There are 322 counties, and 5,319 parishes within the state. They are part of the Lands administrative divisions of Australia. Queensland had been divided into 109 counties in the nineteenth century, before the Land Act of 1897 subdivided many of these counties to 319. Some of the eastern counties remained the same, with most of the subdivisions occurring in the west and north. The current counties were named and bounded by the Governor in Council on 7 March 1901.

In 2006, the government sought advice about a plan to abolish the counties and parishes within the state. From 30 November 2015, the government no longer referenced counties and parishes in land information systems however the Museum of Lands, Mapping and Surveying retains a record for historical purposes.

Land districts 

Queensland was divided into districts in the mid-nineteenth century. The districts still exist today, forming the top level of Queensland's land titles system.

Burke (named after Burke and Wills)
Cook
Darling Downs
Leichhardt
Maranoa
Mitchell
Moreton
North Gregory
North Kennedy
Port Curtis
South Gregory
South Kennedy
Warrego
Wide Bay/Burnett

19th century counties 

There were 109 counties in Queensland by the late nineteenth century, before they were subdivided into the current 322 counties. All of these original counties continue to exist but many are smaller than they were in the nineteenth century, with many new counties added. For the counties which were subdivided in 1901, the original county remains, usually around the largest town in the area, but smaller than before. For instance the nineteenth century county of Beaconsfield was based around Cloncurry; Cloncurry is still in Beaconsfield, but the county is much smaller, with new counties such as Argylla, Sellwyn and Alison surrounding it.

List of counties by district

Moreton, Darling Downs and Wide Bay/Burnett Districts

Burke District 
Albion
Allison
Argylla
Beaconsfield (including Cloncurry)
Brahe
Buller
Burke
Canobie
Carpentaria
Chudleigh
Douglas
Dutton
Eddington
Esmeralda
Fielding
Glenora
Granada
Gregory
Howitt
Iffley
Kamileroi
Lamington
Landsborough
Manfred
Morstone
Mueller
Nash
Nicholson
Norman (including Normanton)
Oaklands
Parker
Philp
Porchester
Richmond
Rochedale (including Mount Isa)
Rupert
Savannah
Saxby
Selwyn
Stokes
Surrey
Talawanta
Taldora
Tewinga
Toorak
Undilla
Wellesley (Wellesley Islands)
Wentworth
Wondoola
Wongalee
Wonomo
Woolgar
Yappar

Cook District 
 Archer
 Balurga
 Banks (including Cooktown)
 Bolwarra
 Byerley
 Chelmsford
 Coen
 Cootah
 Copperfield
 Dagmar
 Dulhunty
 Dunbar
 Etheridge
 Franklin
 Gilbert (including Georgetown)
 Gould
 Hann
 Hodgkinson
 Jardine
 Kalkah
 Kendall
 King
 Koolatah
 Lang
 Linasleigh
 Lukin
 Lynd
 Lyndhurst
 Maramie
 Marga
 Melville
 Mosman
 Nares (including Cairns)
 Pera
 Percy
 Shelburne
 Sidmouth
 Solander
 Somerset
 Strathleven
 Strathmore
 Tate
 Torres (Torres Strait Islands)
 Victor
 Walsh
 Warner
 Weipa
 Weymouth
 Wrotham
 Yagoonya
 York

Leichhardt District 
 Aberdeen
 Bauhinia
 Cairns
 Clermont
 Consuelo
 Dawson
 Denison
 Ferguson
 Fortescue
 Humboldt
 Killarney
 Kimberley
 Labouchere
 Leura
 Plantagenet
 Roper
 Talbot
 Tingarra
 Westgrove
 Wodehouse
 Wooroora

Maranoa District 
 Belmore
 Bundara
 Cogoon
 Dublin
 Elgin
 Kennedy
 Maranoa
 Mungallala
 Nebine
 Tomoo
 Waldegrave (including Roma)
 Warrong

Mitchell District 
 Barcoo
 Cassillis
 Cheviot
 Coorajah
 Coreena
 Cumberland
 Evora
 Fermoy
 Gayundah
 Maneroo
 Mexico
 Mitchell
 Musgrave
 Paluma
 Portland (including Longreach)
 Rodney (including Barcaldine and Aramac)
 Ruthven
 Tambo
 Towerhill
 Uanda
 Ularunda
 Vergemont
 Walker
 Warbreccan
 Windeyer
 Wolseley
 Wooroolah
 Woura
 Youranigh

North Gregory District 
Amaroo
Ayrshire (including Winton)
Binburie
Brighton
Buckingham
Carrandotta
Chatsworth
Currawilla
Diamantina
Elderslie
Eurinye
Eyre
Farrar
Georgina
Glengyle
Hamilton
Kynuna
Malwa
Manuka
Mayne
Merlin
Monkira
Mowarra
Nyama
Oondooroo
Piturie
Rosebrook
Sandringham
Sturt
Toko
Warburton
Waverley
Wills
Windsor
Wokingham
Woodstock

North Kennedy District 
 Cardwell (including Hinchinbrook Island)
 Clarke
 Dalrymple
 Davenport (including Charters Towers)
 Elphinstone (including Townsville)
 Gladstone
 Griffith
 Gunnawarra
 Herbert (including Bowen and the Whitsunday Islands)
 Murray
 O'Connell
 Salisbury
 Wairuna
 Wilkie Gray

Port Curtis District 
 Clinton (including Gladstone)
 Deas Thompson
 Flinders
 Liebig
 Livingstone (including Rockhampton)
 Murchison
 Pakington
 Palmerston
 Pelham
 Raglan

South Gregory District 
 Abbotsford
 Bulgroo
 Burarie
 Cameron
 Carruthers
 Conbar
 Cooper
 Curralle
 Daroo
 Durham
 Durrie
 Gordon
 Grey
 Haddon
 Kyabra
 Pender
 Rosebery (including Birdsville)
 Tanbar
 Titheroo
 Thunda
 Weramo
 Weringa
 Wilson
 Windula

South Kennedy District 
 Albany
 Beaufort
 Bell
 Belyando
 Buckland
 Carlisle (including Mackay)
 Chataway
 Claude
 Dickson
 Drake
 Drummond
 Drury
 Foxton
 Grosvenor
 Hillalong
 Rutledge
 Sellheim

Warrego District 
 Bando
 Bulloo
 Burenda
 Burrandilla
 Chesterton
 Glanworth
 Gowan
 Humeburn
 Kungie
 Kyrunda
 Langlo
 McKinlay
 Munga
 Nickavilla
 Nive
 Noorama
 Norley
 Numalla
 Orrery (including Charleville)
 Palmer
 Paroo
 Pitteroo
 Ross
 Titheroo
 Wellington (including Cunnamulla)
 Wyara

List of counties and number of parishes

References 

 
History of Queensland
Cadastral divisions Queensland
Cadastral divisions